Mount Elusive is an  elevation glaciated summit located  northwest of Valdez in the Chugach Mountains of the U.S. state of Alaska. It is part of the Dora Keen Range, which is a 25-miles-long divide separating Harvard Glacier from Yale Glacier. The mountain was so named in 1957 by Lawrence E. Nielsen because of the peak's "elusive character in trying to locate its position on the map from aerial photos," and later officially adopted by the U.S. Board on Geographic Names in 1965. Nielsen was leader of the Chugach Mountains Expedition which was sponsored by the Arctic Institute of North America. The first ascent of this mountain was made June 22, 1957, by Nielsen and expedition party via the south ridge. He described the most distinguishing feature of this snow-covered mountain as being a spectacular north–south knife-edge summit ridge.

Climate

Based on the Köppen climate classification, Mount Elusive is located in a subarctic climate zone with long, cold, snowy winters, and cool summers. Weather systems coming off the Gulf of Alaska are forced upwards by the Chugach Mountains (orographic lift), causing heavy precipitation in the form of rainfall and snowfall. Temperatures can drop below −20 °C with wind chill factors below −30 °C. This climate supports the Harvard and Columbia Glaciers surrounding this mountain. The months May through June offer the most favorable weather for climbing.

See also

List of mountain peaks of Alaska
Geography of Alaska

References

External links
 Weather: Mount Elusive

Elusive
Elusive
Elusive